Zia Ahmed psc was a major general of the Bangladesh Army and former chairman of Bangladesh Telecommunication Regulatory Commission.

Early life 
Ahmed was born on 26 July 1954 in Sujanagar Upazila, Pabna District, East Pakistan, Pakistan. His father was Sarder Jayenuddin, a notable poet. He graduated from Tejgaon Polytechnic High School and Notre Dame College, Dhaka.

Career 
Ahmed was commissioned in the Signals Corps of Bangladesh Army in 1975.

Ahmed had served in the United Nations Operation in Mozambique.

Ahmed was sent into forced retirement from Bangladesh Army during the 2001 to 2006 Bangladesh Nationalist Party government with the rank of brigadier general.
After Awami League came to power in 2009, Ahmed was promoted to Major General and appointment chairman of Bangladesh Telecommunication Regulatory Commission in February 2009. He replaced Major General Manzurul Alam. He was appointed on a three year contract. He signed the agreement for the Bangladesh Telecommunication Regulatory Commission's Bangabandhu Satellite. He had demanded 30 billion taka in taxes from Grameenphone, the largest telecom company in Bangladesh. After Alam, Ahmed was the second Army officer to head the Bangladesh Telecommunication Regulatory Commission.

In November 2010, Ahmed spoke at a event organized by Lieutenant General Harun-Ar-Rashid which criticised the political statements issued by former Army officers in favor of former Prime Minister Khaleda Zia. He also briefly blocked Facebook that year in Bangladesh.

Ahmed made the pulse rate for cellphone operators at 10 seconds. He struggled with the Ministry of Posts, Telecommunications and Information Technology over organizational jurisdiction harming ties between the two entities.

Death 
Ahmed died on 11 September 2012 in United Hospital, Dhaka, Bangladesh. He was buried in Banani Army Graveyard.

References 

1954 births
2012 deaths
Bangladesh Army generals
People from Pabna District